Michał Goliński (born March 17, 1981, in Poznań) is a Polish footballer (midfielder) who last played for Warta Poznań.

Career

Club
He joined Cracovia from Zagłębie Lubin in late August 2009.

In July 2011, he signed a contract with Warta Poznań.

National team
He played five times for Poland national football team.

Poland Goals

Family
He has a younger brother - Mirosław who is a footballer as well.

References

External links
 
 

1981 births
Living people
Polish footballers
Poland international footballers
Lech Poznań players
Widzew Łódź players
Dyskobolia Grodzisk Wielkopolski players
Obra Kościan players
Zagłębie Lubin players
MKS Cracovia (football) players
Warta Poznań players
Footballers from Poznań
Association football midfielders